Abraham Ramos  (born 13 February 1974 in Mexico City) is a Mexican actor who has appeared in many telenovelas and television series. He was born in Mexico City, Mexico.

Career 

Abraham is the youngest of the four siblings. His first role was in Retrato de familia, a telenovela of Lucy Orozco, in 1995, together with Helena Rojo and Alfredo Adame. In 1995 he also acted in La paloma. Other telenovelas in which he has acted are: Canción de amor, Mi querida Isabel, María Isabel, Sin ti, Camila, Laberintos de pasión amongst others.

In 2002 he played the role of Enrique Mendoza in the telenovela Las vias del amor. His character was obsessed with Perla (Aracely Arambula) and went so far as to kill his father on their wedding night out of jealousy, but it was revealed in the ending of the telenovela that she was in fact his cousin.

In 2004 he played Efraín in the telenovela Inocente de ti together with Helena Rojo and Carolina Tejera.

In January 2012, Ramos confirmed that he was in a relationship with Olivia Collins, whom he had acted with in the series Dos hogares.

Telenovelas
 Por amar sin ley (2018)....Abogado Ornelas
 Quiero amarte (2013/2014)....David Serrano
 Dos hogares (2011)....Claudio Ballesteros
 Cuidado con el ángel (2008)-(2009)....Adrián Gonzáles
 Al diablo con los guapos (2007)....Sergio
 Bajo las riendas del amor (2007)....Sebastián Corcuera
 Peregrina (2005)....Iván
 Inocente de ti (2004–2005)....Efraín
 Las vías del amor (2002)....Enrique
 Mujer bonita (2001)....Orlando
 Siempre te amaré (2000)....Leonardo Reyes
 Laberintos de pasión (1999–2000)....Cristóbal Valencia
 Camila (1998–1999)....Pablo
 Sin ti (1997–1998)....
 Maria Isabel (1997–1998)....Ramón
 Mi querida Isabel (1996–1997)....Rolando
 Canción de amor (1996)....Adrián
 Retrato de familia (1995–1996)....Jaime

Television series
 Sin miedo a la verdad (2018-2019)...Ramón
 Como dice el dicho (2011–2015) 6 episodes
 Tiempo final (Fox) (2009) Capítulo "El Clown"
 Mujeres asesinas (2008)....Julián Castaño
 Mujer casos de la vida real 16 episodes (1995–2006)

Movies
 La ultima llamada (1996).... Mario Cortés (age 20)
 Como tú me has deseado (2005)....Aníbal Soler

References

1974 births
Living people
Male actors from Mexico City
Mexican male telenovela actors
Mexican male television actors